The Texas Longhorns men's cross country team was founded in 1920 and has 33 Southwest Conference championships and has placed as high as 3rd in the NCAA Men's Division I Cross Country Championship.

The 1956 individual championship was won by Walter McNew with a time of 19:55.94.

Yearly Record

Source

See also
Texas Longhorns women's cross country
Texas Longhorns men's track and field
Texas Longhorns women's track and field

References